Henry Ward Oxendine (September 4, 1940 – November 19, 2020) was an American lawyer and politician who served as a member of the North Carolina House of Representatives for the 21st District from 1973 to 1976. A member of the Lumbee tribe, he was the first Native American to serve in the North Carolina General Assembly.

Early life 
Henry Ward Oxendine was born on September 4, 1940, in Robeson County, North Carolina, United States to Lockey Oxendine and Nancy Locklear Oxendine. He was a member of the Lumbee tribe. He was raised on a farm in the Union Chapel community in Robeson County. He attended Pembroke High School and thereafter served in the United States Air Force. Disappointed by military life, he enrolled in Pembroke State University, graduating in 1964 with a Bachelor of Science in social studies. He married Sandra Ransom on August 20, 1965, and had two sons with her. He worked as a school teacher for six years before deciding to study law. Frustrated by the lack of success of Native American candidates for public office in the 1960s, he figured that law school would give him credentials that would assist in a political career. He also concluded that a legal career would give him "more independence" than a teaching career.

Career 
In 1973, a member of the North Carolina House of Representatives for the 21st District, Frank S. White, died. On March 15 the district Democratic Party executive committee nominated Oxendine to fill the vacancy. He was subsequently appointed to the office by the Governor of North Carolina and sworn in to his seat on March 19, 1973 by North Carolina Secretary of State Thad Eure in a short ceremony before the legislature began its evening session. He thus became the first Native American to serve in the North Carolina General Assembly. In his first press conference, Oxendine stated, "I hope my appointment will restore some confidence and trust in the democratic system which Indians have lost through years of frustration and disappointment. I hope to help bring about respect and understanding between the races." The Carolina Indian Voice lamented his appointment, suggesting that he was "a fine, sincere man, but he is not necessarily the choice of the people".

By the time Oxendine took his seat most of the major bills in the legislature's 1973 session had already been proposed. He voted for increased public education appropriations and the creation of a law which mandated the revocation of a driver's license if a motorist refused to take a breathalyzer test. He voted against the holding of a referendum on legalizing liquor-by-the-drink sales, saying that it would risk increased consumption of alcohol and make roadways unsafe. Oxendine was enrolled at North Carolina Central University School of Law at the time of his appointment to the legislature, but made an arrangement with the dean whereby he could take his courses when the General Assembly was not in session. He graduated later in 1973 with a Juris Doctor. In June 1974 he opened a law practice in Pembroke.

Oxendine was reelected to his seat and placed on the Insurance, Education, Higher Education, Corrections, Base Budget, Human Resources, and Judiciary committees. During the 1975 session he mostly refrained from proposing new bills and instead cosigned legislation introduced by other representatives which he supported. He cosigned several measures recommended to the legislature by the Commission on Sentencing Criminal Punishment and Rehabilitation aimed at prison reform. He also sponsored a successful bill which allowed a person found guilty of writing a bad check to pay fines and restitution without a court trial. In March 1976 Oxendine announced his intention not to seek reelection to the House but instead campaign for a judgeship in the 16th Judicial District, though he remained committed to serving out the rest of his legislative term through November. He lost the August primary election for the judgeship and was succeeded in the legislature by Horace Locklear.

In March 1977 Governor Jim Hunt appointed Oxendine to represent the 6th Highway Division on the North Carolina Secondary Roads Council. In July he was appointed to the newly created North Carolina Board of Paroles by Hunt. He was sworn in on July 18. In 2008 he became a judge on the Supreme Court of the Lumbee Tribe.

Later life 
Oxendine died on November 19, 2020.

References

Works cited

1940 births
2020 deaths
Lumbee people
Democratic Party members of the North Carolina House of Representatives
North Carolina lawyers
North Carolina Central University alumni
United States Air Force airmen